Hankavan; is a village and a summer resort in the Kotayk Province of Armenia along in the Marmarik River below the Pambak mountains range. It is notable for its mineral springs, which were used as part of a sanitarium industry during the Soviet period.

Demographics
Hankavan is one of the last Greek communities in Armenia.
At the village entrance there is a church and a graveyard to the left. The church was built by Greeks who immigrated from the Ottoman Empire in 1827.  Graves date back to that time. Originally, seven families moved to this village, a number that grew to a thriving village of 250 families. What remains are about 50 families who trace their ancestry to the Greek mainland.

Industry
A gold mine located in the village was recently sold for around $30 million.

References

See also 
Kotayk Province

Notes

External links
 Guide to Hankavan 
 Guide to Jirvez and Hankavan

Populated places in Kotayk Province
Mountain resorts in Armenia